The 2019 Albany Great Danes football team represented the University at Albany, SUNY in the 2019 NCAA Division I FCS football season. They were led by Greg Gattuso, in his sixth season as head coach, and played their home games at Bob Ford Field at Tom & Mary Casey Stadium. The Great Danes played as members of the Colonial Athletic Association for the sixth season. They finished the season 9–5, 6–2 in CAA play to finish in second place. They received an at-large bid to the FCS Playoffs where they defeated Central Connecticut in the first round before losing in the second round to Montana State.

Previous season

The Great Danes finished the 2018 season 3–8, 1–7 in CAA play to finish in last place.

Preseason

CAA poll
In the CAA preseason poll released on July 23, 2019, the Great Danes were predicted to finish in twelfth place.

Preseason All–CAA team
The Great Danes did not have any players selected to the preseason all-CAA team.

Schedule

Source:

Game summaries

at Central Michigan

Bryant

at Monmouth

Lafayette

William & Mary

at Richmond

at Towson

Rhode Island

Maine

at Delaware

New Hampshire

at Stony Brook

FCS Playoffs
The Great Danes were selected for the postseason tournament, with a first-round pairing against Central Connecticut.

Central Connecticut–First Round

at Montana State–Second Round

References

Albany
Albany Great Danes football seasons
Albany
Albany Great Danes football